Voorweg is a RandstadRail station in Zoetermeer, the Netherlands.

History
The station opened as a railway station on 22 May 1977 as part of the Zoetermeerlijn, operating Zoetermeer Stadslijn services. The station closed on 3 June 2006 and reopened as a RandstadRail station on 29 October 2006, for the HTM tram services (4), and on 20 October 2007, for tram service 3.

The station features four platforms on two levels that are at right angles with each other. The bottom two are the tracks from The Hague, which have not yet entered the Zoetermeer circuit. The platforms are low and at the same level as the tram doors.

It is one of only three stations in the world in which the same metro line still passes through it twice in a pretzel configuration (the others being Monument Metro Station on the Tyne and Wear Metro in Newcastle-Upon-Tyne, England and Serdika and Serdika II stations on the Sofia Metro in Sofia, Bulgaria). A similar situation also existed for 14 years in Canada on the Vancouver SkyTrain at Commercial–Broadway station and briefly on the Toronto subway, also in Canada, at Bloor-Yonge, for six months in 1966.

Passengers can change at Voorweg for Meerzicht, Driemanspolder, Delftsewallen and Dorp to get their destination faster.

Services
The following services currently call at Voorweg:

Although RR3 stops at both levels, RR4 stops only at the lower level.

Gallery

Railway stations opened in 1977
RandstadRail stations in Zoetermeer